Patricia Roberts may refer to:

 Patricia Roberts Harris (1924–1985), member of the Cabinet of the United States
 Patricia Roberts (basketball) (born 1955), American basketball coach and player
 Patricia Murphy (referee) (born 1981), Irish snooker referee also known as Patricia Roberts
 Patricia Easterbrook Roberts (1910–1987), Australian-born floral designer, author, and landscape designer
 Pat Roberts (golfer) (1921–2013), Welsh golfer